Upper All's Well Cave is a cave in the British Overseas Territory of Gibraltar. The sentry on guard would use this cave as a look out post and would shout down to the next soldier lower down every 15 minutes 'All's Well', this would in turn be sent to the next soldier until reaching Grand Casemates Square where All's Well pub now stands.

See also
List of caves in Gibraltar

References

Caves of Gibraltar